Gillingham Football Club is an English association football club originally formed in 1893 and known until 1913 as New Brompton F.C.  The first man to hold a role equivalent to what is today referred to as a manager was William Ironside Groombridge, who was appointed as club secretary in June 1896 and quickly expanded the role to cover all aspects of team and club administration.  Apart from two two-year spells when the club opted to appoint a full-time team manager to allow Groombridge to concentrate solely on club administration, he fulfilled the dual roles of secretary and manager until after the First World War.  Upon being admitted to the Football League in May 1920, the club appointed Robert Brown as manager, but he resigned without ever taking charge of a match.  He was replaced by Scotsman John McMillan, the club's first non-English manager.

The next significant manager of Gillingham was Archie Clark, under whose management the club returned to the Football League in 1950, having been voted out in 1938.  Freddie Cox was the first manager to win a major trophy with Gillingham, taking the Football League Fourth Division championship in the 1963–64 season. Under his successor, Basil Hayward, the club was relegated back to the Fourth Division in the 1970–71 season, but Andy Nelson led the club to promotion back to Division Three three years later.  After the Gills were relegated once again in the 1988–89 season, Tony Pulis managed the club to promotion seven years later.  Pulis also took the team to the final of the play-offs for promotion to the second tier of English football in the 1998–99 season.  Pulis was sacked immediately after this for gross misconduct, but his successor, Peter Taylor, took the club back to the play-off final the following season, in which victory over Wigan Athletic saw the club promoted to Division One for the first time in its history. Peter Taylor left to join Leicester during the close season and club captain Andy Hessenthaler took over as manager for the club's first, and to date only, stint in the second tier.

After Hessenthaler was dismissed following a poor start to the 2004–05 season, the club saw a number of managers come and go in a relatively short time before Mark Stimson's arrival in 2007. His two and a half-year tenure saw the club promoted back to the third tier via the play-offs, but he was dismissed the following season. Hessenthaler then returned to the club for a period of two years before he was promoted to Director of Football to make way for Martin Allen.  Allen became only the second manager to win a trophy with the club, leading the team to the League Two championship in 2013, but he was dismissed a few months into the following season after a poor start, following which another former manager, Peter Taylor, returned to the club.

Managers
Statistics are correct up to the end of the 2021–22 season and include all senior competitive peacetime first-team matches.  Minor county competitions such as the Kent Senior Cup and Kent Senior Shield are not included as the club rarely, if ever, fielded its first team.

References 
General

Specific

Managers
 
Gillingham